Straightaway Glacier, also known as Crosson Glacier, is a glacier in Denali National Park and Preserve in the U.S. state of Alaska. The glacier begins in the Alaska Range on the north side of Mount Crosson, moving northwest. It is a source of the Foraker River.

See also
 List of glaciers

References

Glaciers of Denali Borough, Alaska
Glaciers of Denali National Park and Preserve
Glaciers of Alaska